Patricia Nangozo Kainga is a politician in Malawi.

Kainga represents Zomba Central in the National Assembly of Malawi.

See also
Politics of Malawi

References

Living people
Year of birth missing (living people)
Members of the National Assembly (Malawi)
Malawian women in politics
21st-century Malawian politicians
Place of birth missing (living people)